This is a list of royal commissions appointed by the Government of Western Australia since 1934:

Footnotes

References

 
Royal commissions
Western Australian